Montague Massy-Westropp (c. 1891 –  c. 1974) was a rugby union player who represented Australia.

Massy-Westropp, a wing, was born in Temora, New South Wales and claimed 1 international rugby cap for Australia.

References

                   

Australian rugby union players
Australia international rugby union players
1890s births
1974 deaths
Rugby union players from New South Wales
Rugby union wings